Die 4 da is an Austrian television series.

See also 
 List of Austrian television series

External links 
 

Austrian television series
ORF (broadcaster)
2000s Austrian television series
2007 Austrian television series debuts
2008 Austrian television series endings
German-language television shows